
The Chushka Spit is a sandy spit in the northern part of the Strait of Kerch which extends from Cape Achilleion to the south-west in the direction of the Black Sea for almost . Administratively, it belongs to Temryuksky District, Krasnodar Krai, Russia.

Geography 
The Chushka Spit forms the northern shore of Taman Bay; the southern shore was formerly the Tuzla Spit. It has many long branches extending to the south and was formerly joined to the Kerch Peninsula by the 1944 Kerch railway bridge. The main harbour on the spit is Port Kavkaz. It is also the terminal of the Kerch Strait ferry line connecting the Taman Peninsula with the Crimea.

Ecology 

During a storm in November 2007, a Russian-flagged oil tanker was damaged off the Chushka Spit, resulting in the release of more than 2000 metric tons of fuel oil. Invertebrates such as Mytilus galloprovincialis  were badly affected by the spill, but recovered by the following summer.

Lighthouse 

See also 
 Spits of Azov Sea
 Dolgaya Spit
 Arabat Spit

References 

Spits of Krasnodar Krai
Spits of the sea of Azov
Kerch Strait
Lighthouses in Russia